Luigi Antoldi (Mantua, died 1878) was an Italian engraver.

Biography
He is known for having made many lithographic prints of antique paintings. In 1838, he published a book on prints by Andrea Mantegna. His lithographic portrait of Giulia Contessa Magnaguti married to Gerardi di Pietrapiana is presently in Lombardy. It is unclear if he is related to Francesco Antoldi, who published a traveler's guide to Mantua in 1817.

References

19th-century Italian painters
Italian male painters
1878 deaths
Painters from Mantua
Italian engravers
Year of birth missing
19th-century Italian male artists